The Beciul (also: Băligoasa) is a left tributary of the river Sărățel in Romania. It flows into the Sărățel in Scorțoasa.

References

Rivers of Romania
Rivers of Buzău County